Gmina Miłkowice is a rural gmina (administrative district) in Legnica County, Lower Silesian Voivodeship, in south-western Poland.

Neighbouring gminas
Gmina Miłkowice is bordered by the town of Legnica and the gminas of Chojnów, Krotoszyce, Kunice, Lubin and Złotoryja.

Villages
The gmina contains the villages of Bobrów, Dobrzejów, Głuchowice, Gniewomirowice, Goślinów, Grzymalin, Jakuszów, Jezierzany, Kochlice, Lipce, Miłkowice, Pątnówek, Rzeszotary, Siedliska, Studnica and Ulesie.

References

Milkowice
Legnica County